Port Morris Junction is the railroad connection between NJ Transit's Montclair-Boonton Line and the Lackawanna Cut-Off. Opened in 1911 by the Lackawanna Railroad, it is in the Port Morris, New Jersey section of Roxbury Township, New Jersey, south of Lake Hopatcong.

History 
Soon after rail service began in the 1850s, the Lackawanna Railroad built a rail yard on the east side of the Morris Canal. The yard was initially used to shift coal from railcars to canal barges.  By the turn of the 20th century, however, the canal was little used (it would be abandoned in 1924) and the yard was used primarily to store freight cars. As Lackawanna officials planned a route to shorten travel time from New York City to Buffalo, New York, the yard offered a compelling reason to begin the Cut-Off at Port Morris.

Port Morris Tower opened on December 23, 1911, and the first train to use the Cut-Off passed shortly after midnight the following morning.  Port Morris Junction was part of the Lackawanna until October 17, 1960; the Erie Lackawanna Railroad until April 1, 1976; and Conrail until February 27, 1979, when the tower was closed. Conrail abandoned the Cut-Off in 1983 and pulled up the tracks at the junction in October 1984.

During 1983, NJ Transit (NJT) had taken over the operation of commuter rail service in New Jersey, including through the old Port Morris Junction area.  Later that decade, NJT began operating a rail yard there. Initially, the bridge department began operating out of Port Morris Yard.  Then, in the 1990s, a commuter rail yard was built at Port Morris, allowing commuter trainsets to begin their weekday morning eastbound runs at Hackettstown, Mount Olive, Netcong or Lake Hopatcong from the yard rather than the yard in Dover, as had previously been the case.  These trains then proceed to Denville where they travel to Hoboken via the Morristown Line or the Montclair-Boonton Line.  Connections along the way allow travel to New York City.  Westbound travel runs this pattern in reverse.  (As of 2018, there was no weekend service west of Dover.)

Further reconstruction may extend service to Scranton, Pennsylvania,  from Port Morris. In 2021, Amtrak created a map with future rail corridors on it. Included on this map was service between New York City and Scranton via the Lackawanna Cut-Off.

Notes

References
 
 
 
The Lackawanna Railroad in Northwestern New Jersey by Larry Lowenthal and William T. Greenberg, Jr., Tri-State Railway Historical Society, Inc., 1987.
Farewell to the Lackawanna Cut-Off (Parts I-IV), by Don Dorflinger, published in the Block Line, Tri-State Railway Historical Society, Inc., 1984–1985.

See also
North Jersey Rail Commuter Association

External links
Penn-Jersey Rail Coalition
Lackawanna Coalition
New Jersey Association of Railroad Passengers

Rail junctions in the United States
Rail yards in New Jersey
New Jersey railroads
Delaware, Lackawanna and Western Railroad
Erie Lackawanna Railway
Conrail
NJ Transit Rail Operations
Transportation buildings and structures in Morris County, New Jersey
Lackawanna Cut-Off